This is a list of Atlantic Coast Conference men's basketball regular season first-place finishers, including ties. Notably, all champions after 1961 are considered unofficial by the conference, as the ACC elected to eliminate the regular season title following that season. Since then, the conference's bylaws have stated the sole champion is the winner of the ACC tournament, a rule that remains in place to this day. The conference's automatic NCAA berth is reserved for the ACC Tournament winner. However, the conference specifically allows schools to hang championship banners for regular season titles even if they are not "officially" considered conference championships.

By school

By year

See also
 Atlantic Coast Conference men's basketball
 ACC men's basketball tournament
 List of Atlantic Coast Conference men's basketball tournament champions

Notes

Regular Season champions